CMFT is the debut solo album by American rock musician Corey Taylor. It was released on October 2, 2020, by Roadrunner Records.

Critical reception
Wall of Sound scored the album 7.5/10, stating: "[Corey Taylor is] doing something that he's always wanted to do. You're not going to hear these songs on a Stone Sour or Slipknot album, but you will hear them on CMFT which presents the iconic frontman's progression as a musician and just how talented he can be when he tries his hand at genres that have piqued his interest over the years."

Track listing
All lyrics and music are written by Corey Taylor, except where noted.

CMFB… Sides
On 25 February 2022, Taylor released a follow-up to CMFT called "CMFB… Sides" It includes nine unreleased B-sides, acoustic renditions, live versions, and covers of tracks that inspired Slipknot.

CMFB… Sides Track listing
All lyrics and music are written by Corey Taylor, except where noted.

Personnel
Credits adapted from the album's liner notes.

Musicians
 Corey Taylor – vocals, guitar, piano, production
 Christian Martucci – guitar, vocals
 Zach Throne – guitar, vocals
 Jason Christopher – bass, vocals
 Walter Bäcklin – additional keyboards, programming
 Dustin Robert – drums, percussion, vocals

Technical personnel
 Jay Ruston – production, engineering, mixing
 Tristan Hardin – recording and mixing assistant, additional engineering
 John Douglass – additional engineering
 Paul Logus – mastering
 Rem Massingill – guitar technician
 Robbie Cope – drum technician

Charts

See also
Look Outside Your Window

References

2020 debut albums
Roadrunner Records albums